Hard To Kill is a professional wrestling pay-per-view event produced by Impact Wrestling, which is annually held during the month of January. The event was first held in 2020 and has since become one of the promotion's "Big Four" events (along with Rebellion, Slammiversary, and Bound for Glory).

Events

References

External links 
Impact Wrestling

 
Recurring events established in 2020